"Friends Don't" is a song co-written and recorded by American country music duo Maddie & Tae. It was released on May 14, 2019 as the lead-off single to their second studio album The Way It Feels.

Content
"Friends Don't" was co-written by both members of Maddie & Tae alongside Justin Ebach and Jon Nite.

Music video
The music video for "Friends Don't" was directed by TK McKamy and premiered on August 3, 2018.

Chart performance

References

2018 singles
2018 songs
Country ballads
2010s ballads
Maddie & Tae songs
Mercury Nashville singles
Songs written by Justin Ebach
Songs written by Jon Nite
Music videos directed by TK McKamy